Chionodes parens is a moth in the family Gelechiidae. It is found in North America, where it has been recorded from Arizona.

The larvae feed on Quercus species.

References

Chionodes
Moths described in 1999
Moths of North America